"Fantasy Island" is a song by Dutch pop group The Millionaires, released as a single in March 1982. It was a top-40 hit in the Netherlands; however, the song is better known for the version released a month later by Tight Fit.

Background
The Millionaires participated with "Fantasy Island" (in Dutch "Fantasie eiland") at the 1982 Nationaal Songfestival, which decided who was going to represent the Netherlands at the Eurovision Song Contest. The song came second in the festival, with the winner being "Jij en ik", performed by Bill van Dijk.

Charts

Tight Fit version

English pop band Tight Fit released their cover as the second single from their album Tight Fit. It peaked at number 5 on the UK Singles Chart.

Reception
Reviewing the song in Record Mirror, Sunie Fletcher described the song as an "Abba impersonation that serves only to show 'Wimoweh' in a relatively good light. Reviewing for Smash Hits, Martin Fry of ABC described it as "diluted Abba, but undoubtedly a hit" and that "the song goes around and around and beats you into submission".

Track listings

7": Jive / JIVE 13 (UK)
 "Fantasy Island" – 3:23
 "Saturday Heartbreak" – 3:10

7": Jive / 6.13 463 (Germany)
 "Fantasy Island" – 3:23
 "Like Wildlife" – 3:31

12": Jive / JIVE T13 (UK)
 "Fantasy Island"
 "Saturday Heartbreak"

12": Jive / 6.20 149 (Germany)
 "Fantasy Island" – 5:09
 "Like Wildlife" – 3:31

Charts

References

External links
 Lyrics of this song
 

1982 singles
1982 songs
Jive Records singles
Songs written by Piet Souer
Song recordings produced by Tim Friese-Greene